Acton is a civil parish in Cheshire East, England. It contains 24 buildings that are recorded in the National Heritage List for England as designated listed buildings.  Of these, two are listed at Grade I, the highest grade, four are listed at Grade II*, the middle grade, and the others are at Grade II.  Apart from the village of Acton, the parish is rural.  Listed buildings in the village include the church and associated structures, houses, a public house and a telephone kiosk.  The major structure is the parish is Dorfold Hall; this and associated structures are listed.  The other items include an aqueduct carrying the Shropshire Union Canal across a road, farmhouses and cottages.

Key

Buildings

See also
Listed buildings in Burland
Listed buildings in Edleston 
Listed buildings in Henhull
Listed buildings in Hurleston
Listed buildings in Nantwich

References
Citations

Sources

 

 

Listed buildings in the Borough of Cheshire East
Lists of listed buildings in Cheshire